A criminal court may impose a "mandate" as part of a legal process on a person accused of a crime consisting of an obligation to engage in certain conditions or activities in exchange for suspension or reduction in penalty; such as, conditions of probation, conditional discharges, or other conditional sentences.  For example, a defendant convicted of driving while intoxicated or drug possession may be mandated to engage in alcoholism or substance abuse rehabilitation. The term is paradoxical because acceptance of the "mandate" is a voluntary act by the defendant, who also has the option of serving what would most generally (though the relative weight is a matter determined by the individual's perspective and readiness to change) be viewed as a harsher alternative, such as incarceration. In this sense, the mandate is not truly mandatory, but is instead a type of legal fiction wherein the court assumes an illusion of power which, in actuality, is constrained by the defendant's free will.

See also
Free will
Individual mandate
Legal fictions
Motivational interviewing

References

 NYS Office of Court Administration, Office of Court Drug Treatment Programs, Recommended Practices for New York Adult Drug Treatment Courts
 Office of the Special Narcotics Prosecutor for the City of New York, 2006 Annual Report, Bridget G. Brennan
 State of New York, County of Allegany, Drug Treatment Court Contract (sample): "I have read and fully understand the above agreement and execute it on my own free will. No threat or promise of any kind has been made to me by anyone, except as set forth herein."

Legal terminology